The Indian Stamp Act of 1899 (2 of 1899), is an in-force Act of the Government of India for the charging of stamp duty on instruments recording transactions.

Amendments
The act was amended by "Enforcement of Security Interest and Recovery of Debts Laws and Miscellaneous Provisions (Amendment) Bill, 2016", passed by Lok Sabha on 2 August 2016.

References

External links

Legal history of India
1899 in India
Philately of India
Taxation in India